Deen Dayal Upadhyaya railway division, is one of the five railway divisions under East Central Railway zone of Indian Railways. This railway division was formed on 5 November 1951 and its headquarter is located at Pt. Deen Dayal Upadhyaya in the state of Uttar Pradesh of India. Pt. Deen Dayal Upadhyaya Junction and Gaya junction are most busiest station in term of passenger then followed by Dehri-on-Sone, Anugrah Narayan Road and Sasaram . Mughalsarai Junction holds most stoppage of Rajdhani express in India.

Danapur railway division, Dhanbad railway division, Samastipur railway division, and Sonpur railway division are the other railway divisions under ECR Zone headquartered at Hajipur.

The official name was changed from Mughalsarai railway division to Deen Dayal Upadhyaya railway division on 19 January 2020 in honour of Jan Sangh party leader Deen Dayal Upadhyaya who died near Mughalsarai Junction railway station on 11 February 1968 after being pushed from a moving train by robbers. The official name of Mughalsarai railway station was changed in 2018.

List of railway stations and towns 
The list includes the stations under the Mughalsarai railway division and their station category.

Stations closed for Passengers -

References

 
Divisions of Indian Railways
1951 establishments in Uttar Pradesh

Transport in Mughalsarai